Bella Bella may refer to:

Places
 Bella Bella, British Columbia, on Campbell Island, also known as Waglisla
Bella Bella Airport (Campbell Island), airport north west of Bella Bella
 Old Bella Bella, the name for the Heiltsuk village that grew up around the Hudson's Bay Company's historic Fort McLoughlin
 the former Bella Bella Airbase on Denny Island, in operation from 1941 to 1944, was renamed Shearwater, British Columbia in 1952 and remains the site of the Bella Bella post office
Bella Bella Airport, the former name of Denny Island Aerodrome, an airport east of Bella Bella at Shearwater

Indigenous people
 Heiltsuk people, formerly known as the Bella Bella, an indigenous people of the Pacific Northwest Coast
 Heiltsuk language, their language

Other
 Orchestre Bella Bella, a DR Congo musical group
 Bella Bella (album), 1976 Sten & Stanley album
 "Bella Bella" (song), 2019 song by Luca Hänni

See also
Bella Coola (disambiguation)
Bella (disambiguation)
 Bela-Bela, a town in South Africa formerly known as Warmbaths